Naranwala may refer to:

 Naranwala (7°13'N 80°34'E), a village in Sri Lanka
 Naranwala (7°22'N 80°30'E), a village in Sri Lanka